Devialet is a French audio technology company that produces a line of speakers (Phantom) and amplifiers (Expert). It was founded in 2007 in Paris.

History

In 2004, engineer Pierre-Emmanuel Calmel, invented the Analog Digital Hybrid (ADH) audio technology that is the basis of Devialet's products. Three years later, in 2007, he developed an amplifier prototype using the ADH technology, and founded Devialet along with Quentin Sannié and Emmanuel Nardin. At the company's founding, Sannié served as CEO and Calmel as CTO.

Devialet introduced its first product to market, an amplifier called "D-Premier," in 2010. Between 2010 and 2012, Devialet raised over €17 million in funds from a variety of investors.

In June 2013, the company unveiled an updated version of its D-Premier amp changes (known as the Devialet 240) and two new lower-end versions, the Devialet 110 and Devialet 170. In late 2014, the company announced the release of its first speaker, the Devialet Phantom. The speaker was made available in Europe in early 2015. In June 2015, it raised €17.5 million ($20 million) in another round of funding led by previous investors. The purpose of this funding round was to bring the Phantom to the United States market. 

Devialet released two new products in 2016: the "Gold Phantom" speaker capable of producing sound volumes of up to 108 decibels and the Expert PRO amplifier. In November 2016, Devialet raised €100 million in a funding round led by Foxconn, Jay-Z's Roc Nation, and other investors.

In July 2017, Devialet entered into a partnership with the British-based media company Sky to create a soundbar designed for televisions called the "Sky Soundbox." In October, it entered into a 10-year agreement with the Paris Opera to build a "sound discovery room" in the Palais Garnier.
The company also entered into a partnership with Renault to build car audio systems and demonstrated a prototype version for Renault's SYMBIOZ concept car in December 2017.  

Quentin Sannié, who had been the CEO of Devialet from its foundation, stepped down from the role in March 2018 and was replaced by Frank Lebouchard.

Products

Devialet produces a range of wireless speakers called "Phantom" along with a range of amplifiers known as "Expert Pro." The Phantom line is separated into two ranges, Phantom Premier and Phantom Reactor. The company also produces Gemini earbud wireless headphones and the company's home cinema soundbar sound system, the Dione.

In June 2013, the company unveiled an updated version of its D-Premier amp changes (known as the Devialet 240) and two new lower-end versions, the Devialet 110 and Devialet 170. In late 2014, the company announced the release of its first speaker, the Devialet Phantom. The speaker was made available in Europe in early 2015. In June 2015, it raised €17.5 million ($20 million) in another round of funding led by previous investors. The purpose of this funding round was to bring the Phantom to the United States market. 

In June 2016, the company released an upgraded "Gold Phantom" speaker with 4,500 watts of power that was capable of producing sound volumes of up to 108 decibels. Later that year, it announced an "Immersive Theater System" that would make use of several Gold Phantoms.
Devialet continued updating their line of amplifiers (now known as "Expert"), and in late 2016 it introduced the Expert PRO amplifier as a high-end option. The company also opened an outlet store in New York City. In November 2016, Devialet raised €100 million ($106 million) in a funding round led by Ginko Ventures, Foxconn, Jay-Z's Roc Nation, Andy Rubin's Playground Global, Groupe Renault, the Sharp Corporation, and Korelya Capital among others. 

In July 2017, Devialet announced a partnership with media company Sky, to create a sound system called the "Sky Soundbox." In October, it entered into a 10-year agreement with the Paris Opera to build a "sound discovery room" in the Palais Garnier.
In November 2017, the company released an upgraded version of the original Phantom. The following month, it announced another partnership, this time with Renault to create a car audio system. It also demonstrated a prototype system in Renault's Symbioz concept car. 

In March 2018, Quentin Sannié stepped down as the company's CEO and was replaced by Frank Lebouchard, a move that had been planned months in advance. In October of that year, it announced the Phantom Reactor speaker. As of 2018, the company maintains 160 patents for its technologies.
In February 2019, Devialet and Free jointly released a TV set-top box with Devialet speakers. In November 2019, Devialet partnered with Huawei and unveiled a new specifically designed speaker, the Sound X. 

In January 2020, Devialet introduced the Soundform Elite speaker/phone charger designed with Belkin.

Audio technologies

Devialet devices use several audio technologies developed by the company, marketed under these names:

 Analog Digital Hybrid (ADH) combines elements of analog amps (Class-A) and digital amps (Class-D), allowing for larger wattage and decibel peaks. 
 Heart Bass Implosion (HBI) is a technology that provides broader coverage of low-frequency sounds and mimics the properties of a subwoofer. 
 Speaker Active Matching (SAM) is a signal processing mechanism that analyzes and adjusts sounds in real-time to "reproduce the exact acoustic pressure recorded by the microphone."
 Active Co-Spherical Engine (ACE) refers to the spherical shape of some Devialet devices (namely, the Phantom speakers) is an acoustic architecture designed to deliver sound in every direction.

References

External links
Official website

Electronics companies established in 2007
Audio amplifier manufacturers
French companies established in 2007
Audio equipment manufacturers of France
French brands
Manufacturing companies based in Paris